Agrilus suvorovi is a species of beetle in the family Buprestidae, the jewel beetles.

Distribution
This species is present in most of Europe  and in Asia, from Siberia to Japan.

Description
The adult beetle is 6.5 to 9.5 millimeters long. It is metallic green or cyan in color.

Biology
Agrilus suvorovi is a univoltine species. Adults can be found at the end of May or the beginning of June and may be found through July. The  mainly feed on leaves of European Aspen (Populus tremula). The caused damage is negligible. Larvae hollow out long galleries into the bark and the wood of the host plants (Populus tremula, Populus deltoides, 
Populus alba, Salix species) and are considered a pest. Larvae are mature in September and overwinter in the wood. The damage caused is often very serious and leads to death the plants.

References

External links
 Beetle fauna of Germany

suvorovi
Beetles described in 1935